The 2006–07 Kentucky Wildcats men's basketball team represented the University of Kentucky in the college basketball season of 2006–07. The team's head coach was Tubby Smith. This was his 10th and final year as Kentucky's head coach. The Wildcats played their home games at Rupp Arena in Lexington, Kentucky.

2006 signees

Roster

2006–07 Schedule and Results

|-
!colspan=9 style="background:#273BE2; color:#FFFFFF;"| Non-conference regular season

|-
!colspan=9 style="background:#273BE2; color:#FFFFFF;"| SEC Regular Season

|-
!colspan=9 style="background:#273BE2;"| 2007 SEC Tournament

|-
!colspan=9 style="background:#273BE2;"| 2007 NCAA Tournament

References

Kentucky Wildcats men's basketball seasons
Kentucky
Kentucky Wildcats men's basketball
Kentucky Wildcats men's basketball
Kentucky